Baranomys longidens is an extinct species of rodent from the Baranomys genus, from the Baranomyinae subfamily of Cricetidae family. It lived in Pliocene epoch and was an ancestor to modern Arvicolinae. The fossils of the animals had been found in Europe, including near Gundersheim, Germany, and in Poland. It was first described by Kazimierz Kowalski in 1960.

Discovery 
The fossils of the animals had been found in Europe, including near Gundersheim, Germany, and in Poland. The species was first described by Kazimierz Kowalski in 1960. He based his research on fossils evaporated from bone breccia, that was found in Węże Nature Reserve, near the village of Węże, Poland. It was first classified as microtodon longidens, and then reclassified as baranomys longidens.

References 

Cricetidae
Pliocene mammals
Prehistoric rodents
Animals described in 1937